The Tenma or Thiin were an Aboriginal Australian people of the Pilbara region of Western Australia.

Language
The Thiin spoke one of four dialects of Mantharta, the other members of the dialect continuum being the Warriyangka, Djiwarli and Tharrkari.

Country
The Tenma were a small tribe located around the head of the Henry River, the Barlee Range and the Frederick River. Norman Tindale assigned them an estimated  of traditional tribal land.

Alternative names
 Te:n
 Teen

Source:

Notes

Citations

Sources

Aboriginal peoples of Western Australia